Greg Brunner (born June 15, 1983) is a former American-Swiss basketball player.

Career
Brunner signed with Grissin Bon Reggio Emilia in 2012.

National team
From 2010 until 2014, Brunner played for the Swiss national basketball team.

Honours
Belgian Cup (1): 2008
FIBA EuroChallenge (1): 2014

References

1983 births
Living people
American expatriate basketball people in Belgium
American expatriate basketball people in Israel
American expatriate basketball people in Italy
American men's basketball players
Basketball players from Iowa
BC Oostende players
Iowa Hawkeyes men's basketball players
Ironi Nahariya players
Pallacanestro Biella players
Pallacanestro Cantù players
Pallacanestro Reggiana players
Pallacanestro Treviso players
People from Charles City, Iowa
Power forwards (basketball)
RBC Pepinster players
Sutor Basket Montegranaro players
Swiss expatriate basketball people in Italy
Swiss men's basketball players